Longbill may refer to:
One of two species of longbill in the bird family Melanocharitidae
One of six species of longbill, African "warblers" in the genera Macrosphenus and Amaurocichla
The longbill spearfish, a species of marlin

Animal common name disambiguation pages